The 1936–37 Polska Liga Hokejowa season was the ninth season of the Polska Liga Hokejowa, the top level of ice hockey in Poland. Five teams participated in the final round, and KS Cracovia won the championship.

Qualification
 KS Cracovia - Pogoń Lwów 3:1/6:2

Final Tournament

External links
 Season on hockeyarchives.info

Polska Hokej Liga seasons
Polska
1936–37 in Polish ice hockey